Horrid Henry is the first book of the Horrid Henry series. It was published in 1994 and written by Francesca Simon and illustrated by Tony Ross. The book is a collection of short stories about the same characters, along the lines of the Just William books.

Plot

Horrid Henry's Perfect Day
Horrid Henry is an 8 year boy who loves doing unimaginable horrible things. He throws food, he snatches things, he pushes, shoves and pinches. He has a 6 year-old brother called Perfect Peter, an extremely perfect boy who does uncountable good deeds. Peter always says "Please" and "Thank You", he loves vegetables and refuses cake and he never ever picks his nose. One day, Horrid Henry wonders what would happen if he were perfect?! So − the next day, Henry doesn't wake Peter up by splashing water on his head as usual, and Peter and his parents wake up late. Due to this, Henry and Peter are late for a class. Back at home, Henry doesn't bully Peter, instead, he reads a book about super-mice. At dinner time, Henry helps lay the table and ignores Peter's whining that he always lays the table. When the family eat spaghetti and meatballs, Henry does not kick Peter or slurp his food or leave behind his vegetables. Peter wants Henry to become horrid again and tries many ways to get Henry to hit him but Henry is resilient. When Henry's Mum gives Henry some fudge cake and a kiss for being so good, Peter can't stand it any longer and flings his plate at Henry but hits Mum. Mum screams at Peter to go to his room and when Henry laughs, she sends him to his room too. The story ends with Henry being surprised that being perfect was so much fun.

Horrid Henry's Dance Class
Henry and Peter have to go to the school's dance class taught by Miss Impatience Tutu, a very impatient woman who claims she is patient that Henry hates. The class has to play a concert and everyone is practicing for it. Impatience Tutu makes Henry sit behind a false bush for being horrid at her class so he won't embarrass everyone at the concert. When its time for the concert, Henry decides to make his part bigger and by doing so, makes Impatience Tutu stop the concert this story then ends with Henry being happy to finally go for karate.

Horrid Henry & Moody Margaret
Horrid Henry has an archenemy, and that is Moody Margaret. Margaret lives next door to Henry, is in Henry's class and owns all the things that Henry's goody-goody parents don't let him have. This is the only reason that Henry plays with Margaret. The two of them are playing pirates and squabbling over who is going to be Captain Hook and Peter is begging to not be the prisoner. When Margaret reluctantly hands over her Captain Hook role to Henry and takes his role as Mr. Smee and Henry orders her and Peter to walk the plank, she decides not to play pirates. Henry gets fed up and orders her to play but Margaret shrieks at him. Since no one can shriek as loud as her or as piercingly as her, Henry gives her back the hook and she decides to eat something. Selfish Henry doesn't want to share his food with her and gives her horrible choices. When he mentions "Glop"(A dish of horrible food mixed together), Margaret decides that she and Henry make the yuckiest Glop of all and eat it. After putting in horrible ingredients, Margaret eats a spoonful of it and doesn't show how much she hates it, in fact stating that it is good. When Henry doesn't want to eat it but takes a tiny spoonful, Margaret is about to do an unrevealed horrible thing if Perfect Peter had not intervened. He asks for some food and Henry gives him the glop!

Horrid Henry's Holiday
Henry hates holidays. He has a very specific idea of what constitutes an ideal holiday, but his parents always have other plans. But when his family tell him they are going camping in France, he gets excited. However, the place isn't as good as Henry thought it would be. A rainy campsite with filthy toilets and he gets angry again. He tries to knock down tents and play horrible music but Dad stops him. Just as they are about to eat baked beans, it rains. The Family sleeps in the tent soundly but Henry can't due to the sharp rocks and mosquitoes. When they wake up, the family goes for a walk and Henry has to collect firewood. Henry uses the dry, wooden pegs holding up the tents as firewood and creates a big fire. Henry dreams that he is floating but when he wakes up, he finds that he actually is floating! The tent has been flooded, has collapsed and the rain has soaked everyone wet. Henry then takes his family to the campsite that he wanted to go with modernized things and the story ends with the family eating crisps and watching TV.

Publication history
 The book was originally published in hardback in Great Britain, 1994.
 It was first published in paperback in 1995.
 It was reissued in paperback in 2008.
 "Horrid Henry's Holiday" and "Horrid Henry and Moody Margaret" have been reprinted individually as part of the Horrid Henry Early Readers series.
 "Horrid Henry's Holiday" has been reprinted in Horrid Henry's Wicked Ways.
 "Horrid Henry and Moody Margaret" has been reprinted in Horrid Henry's Evil Enemies.
 "Horrid Henry's Dance Class" has been reprinted in Horrid Henry Rules The World.
 The whole book has been reprinted in A Handful of Horrid Henry.

Television adaptation
Horrid Henry is a British animation, based on the popular book series of the same name. It is produced by Novel Entertainment and has been broadcast since 2006. Currently, it is aired on Nicktoons and Netflix. There are 250 episodes within 5 series.
 "Horrid Henry's Perfect Day", "Horrid Henry's Dance Class" and "Horrid Henry's Holiday" were all episodes from the Horrid Henry TV series.
 The making of "Glop" from "Horrid Henry and Moody Margaret" was used as a challenge between Henry and Margaret in the episode "Horrid Henry and the Secret Club" except that Margaret didn't eat the "Glop".

References

External links
 Horrid Henry at the Horrid Henry Official Website.

Horrid Henry
1994 short story collections
Children's short story collections
British children's books
1994 children's books